Beyond (Straight and Gay) Marriage: Valuing All Families under the Law is a 2008 book about family law reform by the legal scholar Nancy D. Polikoff.

Publication history
Beyond (Straight and Gay) Marriage was first published in 2008 by Beacon Press. It was the third entry in the Queer Action/Queer Ideas series, edited by the gay writer Michael Bronski.

Reception
Beyond (Straight and Gay) Marriage received positive reviews from Jay Barth in Choice, Kenyon Farrow in The Indypendent, and Robert L. Mack in the Journal of GLBT Family Studies. Barth praised the book as "thoroughly researched, nicely argued, and well written". He found Polikoff's critique of the mainstream LGBT rights movement's approach to marriage "thought provoking", and recommended the book as suitable for upper-division undergraduates. Farrow credited Polikoff with arguing convincingly "that we have had more progressive moves toward family policy in our country's history". He remarked that Polikoff had provided real-life examples of problems occasioned by tying legal benefits to marriage, and recommended the book to readers "to help you ground your argument in practical terms". Mack described Beyond (Straight and Gay) Marriage as the first "well-researched, thoughtful, and articulate volume-length work" on decoupling legal rights from the institution of marriage in order to accommodate other family structures.

References

Sources

2008 non-fiction books
2000s LGBT literature
American non-fiction books
Beacon Press books
Books about marriage
Books by Nancy Polikoff
English-language books
LGBT literature in the United States